Carlos Alberto Moratorio (10 November 1929 – 7 March 2010) was an Argentine equestrian. He was born in La Cruz, Corrientes. Carlos won a silver medal in individual eventing at the 1964 Summer Olympics in Tokyo. Moratorio also competed at the 1960 Summer Olympics and at the 1968 Summer Olympics. He was a cavalry officer in Argentinian Army.

Carlos was the flag bearer for Argentina at the opening ceremony of the 1968 Summer Olympics in Mexico City, Mexico.

References

External links
 

1929 births
2010 deaths
Olympic silver medalists for Argentina
Equestrians at the 1960 Summer Olympics
Equestrians at the 1964 Summer Olympics
Equestrians at the 1968 Summer Olympics
Olympic medalists in equestrian
Argentine male equestrians
Olympic equestrians of Argentina
Medalists at the 1964 Summer Olympics
Pan American Games medalists in equestrian
Pan American Games bronze medalists for Argentina
Equestrians at the 1963 Pan American Games
Medalists at the 1963 Pan American Games
Sportspeople from Corrientes Province